Manasbal Lake is a freshwater lake located in Safapora area of Ganderbal District in Jammu and Kashmir, India. The name Manasbal is said to be a derivative of Manasarovar. The lake is encircled by four villages viz., Jarokbal, Kondabal, Nesbal (situated on the north-eastern side of the lake) and Gratbal. The large growth of lotus (Nelumbo nucifera) at the periphery of the lake (blooms during July and August) adds to the beauty of the clear waters of the lake. The Mughal garden, called the Jaroka Bagh, (meaning bay window) built by Nur Jahan overlooks the lake.

The lake is a good place for birdwatching as it is one of the largest natural stamping grounds of Aquatic birds in Kashmir and has the sobriquet of "supreme gem of all Kashmir Lakes". The rootstocks of lotus plant which grows extensively in the lake are harvested and marketed, and also eaten by the local people.

Access
The lake is approached from Srinagar by a  road via Shadipora, Nasim and Gandarbal. Road to Wular Lake, the largest lake in Kashmir, passes through this lake, via Safapora.
It is also easy to reach to Manasbal from Sonmarg via ganderbal.

History
It is believed to be an ancient lake by locals but exact dating is yet to be done. Close to the northern shore of the lake are the ruins of a 17th-century fort, called the Jharokha Bagh, built by the Mughals, used in the past by caravans traveling from Punjab to Srinagar.

Topography 
The lake is surrounded by the Baladar mountains on the east, by an elevated plateau known as 'Karewa' comprising lacustrine, fluviatile and loessic deposits on the north and bounded by the Ahtung hills in the south, which are used for limestone extraction.

A fissure is reported to be running from east to west at the centre of the lake.

Land use

Important vegetation in the catchment of the lake comprise Orchards (apple, mulberry), some Platanus (Chinar trees) and Salix trees. Safar, a nearby village of Safapur which has a grove of Chinar trees, is known as Badshah Boni, royal Chinar, and was planted in imitation of the Nasim Bagh in Srinagar. Maize, mustard and wheat are generally the main crops grown in the agricultural lands of the catchment. In recent years, land use pattern has changed with more land used for horticulture and also diversion of land for construction purposes.

Hydrology
Lake water outflows to the Jhelum River through a regulated outflow channel. The lake is the source of water for fishing and for obtaining food and fodder plants.

The lake not only provides source of water but also offers facilities for navigation and transportation, fisheries, harvesting of economically useful plants, sightseeing, tourism and recreation.

Water quality issues
Some of the water quality parameters reported relate  to:

The lake is monomictic mixing type and develops thermal stratification in March to November.
pH value varied from a maximum of 8.8 on the surface to a minimum of 7.7 at  depth in year over the 12 months period
DO [mg l-1] value varied from a maximum of 10.4 on the surface to a minimum of 2.2 at the bottom in year over the 12 months period
Maximum Nitrogen Concentration (NH4-N [micro l-1] of 13 on the surface and 120 at the bottom of the lake have been reported.

Flora
Within the lake water, the flora recorded comprise the following.

Emerged macrophytes, floating macrophytes, submerged macrophytes and phytoplankton. In the reported period, the biomass production due to plankton was a maximum of 864.9 milligrams/cm2 in June with a minimum of 54 milligrams/cm2 in December.

Fauna
The fauna recorded in the lake are the zooplankton, benthos and fish. The economically important fishes reported are:

Schizothorax niger, S. esocinus, Cyprinus carpio specularis+, C. carpio communis+ and Neomacheilus latius.
Note:+ considered economically important

Cyprinus, an exotic species, has proliferated extensively after its introduction in 1956. A decline in the population of indigenous species due to rapid changes in the environment was reported.

Deterioration of the lake 
Eutrophication was recorded and confirmed by the test results in the lake. Ceratophyllum demersum recorded increase in the lake area. Dense mono specific stands have been created by the weeds. Further, decrease in species diversity has occurred, increase in the period of anoxic conditions and accumulation of H2S in deeper waters has been reported. Pollution has also taken place due to lack of waste water treatment plants.

World Wide Fund for Nature (WWF) which conducted an extensive survey of the lake in 1997 attributed the reasons for the deterioration of the lake, particularly on its banks, gradually turning it into a stinking marsh, due to the following.

 large-scale illegal encroachment on the periphery on Ganderbal and Qazibagh sides in the form of hundreds of trees, vegetable gardens, toilets, residential structures, garbage dumping sites
 siltation due to noxious run-off from adjoining fields, stone quarries and lime kilns;
 the flow of sewage and use of fertilizers in the agricultural fields in its adjoining villages
 80 per cent of the lake was seen under the thick blanket of weed

WWF recommended several measures to be undertaken for the restoration of the lake.

Lake restoration works
It was only in the year 2007 that lake restoration measures could be undertaken  with the formation of Wular-Manasbal Development Authority (WMDA) under the Government of Jammu and Kashmir.

WMDA undertook the following measures for restoration and to improve the general environment of the lake.

removing the illegal constructions;
pedestrian walkway/pathway construction around the lake periphery of 
manual de-weeding
dredging
demarcation of the lake
construction of STPs and
regulation of limestone extraction and afforestation of mountains to restore the lake's glory

Chief executive officer of the WMDA has been reported stating that:

Shikara operators of the Lake area have reported that "there has been a lot of improvement in its condition"

Hindu temple

Wullar-Manasbal Development Authority has reported unearthing of an ancient Hindu temple, on the eastern shore of the Manasbal Lake, built in the traditional architectural style of ancient Kashmir. The lower half of the temple, which was buried in earth, was found during the restoration works undertaken for the lake. Dated to 800-900 AD, during Avantivarman or Sankaravarman rule, based on epigraphic writings, the temple, constructed in local grey stone, has a unique  pyramid-shaped roof top with Corinthian or floral motifs. It is stated to be a new pilgrimage attraction for pilgrims who visit the cave shrine at Amarnath and the Kheer Bhawani temple at Tulmulla in Ganderbal district. Other tourist attractions in the lake area are the Manasbal Temple, the ruins of a terraced Mughal garden and sculptured stones of some Buddhist shrines on the banks of the lake.

Naval training of NCC
National Cadet Corps (NCC) started its activities in Kashmir in 1965 but the training facility at Manasbal lake was abandoned in 1989 due to the deterioration of the security situation in Jammu and Kashmir. In September 2022, Indian Navy revived its naval training of the National Cadet Corps at the Manasbal lake. 100 NCC cadets including girls from various colleges of Jammu and Kashmir participates in the camp. A suitable camping site along with adequate infrastructure has been provided by the Manasbal Development Authority on the lakefront. The cadets are trained in various activities like boat pulling, sailing, signalling and ship modelling. Earlier due to closure, these activities were  carried out in Nagrota and Mansar Lake, Jammu.

Water skiing 
The weather is pleasant in the months of May and August, when the lake offers water skiing sport, which is now becoming an increasingly popular activity in many rivers and lakes in India. Jammu & Kashmir Tourism Department (JKTD) provides essential water skiing equipment and trained instructors to adventure seekers. The lake's surface sheen and its long length and width attract tourists to water skiing sport. However, the noise and turbulences of waterskiing boats will totally change the environment of this last quiet lake and could risk to take away one of its main attractions: Peace. There is still a discussion going on whether or not a more environmentally sensitive form of sustainable tourism would be more appropriate for this special lake – to not turn it into a second Dal Lake.

See also

Nigeen Lake
Nundkol Lake
Khanpursar
Wular Lake

References

External links
 Kondabal http://www.fallingrain.com/world/IN/12/Kondabal.html
 https://www.myfeeling.in/2021/12/the-secret-of-manasbal-lake.html

Lakes of Jammu and Kashmir
Tourist attractions in Ganderbal district
9th-century Hindu temples